John Grosh (born August 19, 1992) is an American soccer midfielder.

Career

Youth and college
Grosh played college soccer at Drexel University between 2011 and 2014. While at college, Grosh appeared for USL PDL side Carolina Dynamo in 2014.

Professional
Out of college, Grosh signed with NPSL side Hershey FC for their 2016 season.

Grosh signed with United Soccer League side Harrisburg City Islanders on March 16, 2017.

References

External links

1992 births
Living people
American soccer players
Drexel Dragons men's soccer players
North Carolina Fusion U23 players
Penn FC players
Association football midfielders
Soccer players from Pennsylvania
USL League Two players
USL Championship players